HMS Supply was the American mercantile New Brunswick that the British Royal Navy purchased in October 1793 as a replacement for , which the Navy had sold in the year before.

The Navy commissioned her in April 1794 under Lieutenant William Kent. 

Supply was at Plymouth on 20 January 1795 and so shared in the proceeds of the detention of the Dutch naval vessels, East Indiamen, and other merchant vessels that were in port on the outbreak of war between Britain and the Netherlands.

Supply then served as an armed vessel supporting the needs of the colony at Port Jackson. She made at least one voyage to Norfolk Island transferring prisoners there from New South Wales.

Supply and Reliance sailed in late 1796 to the Cape of Good Hope to gather supplies for the colony. She later returned to Sydney, arriving on 16 May 1797 carrying the stores Governor John Hunter had ordered and merino sheep for John Macarthur.

Buffalo left carrying Captain Hunter, by then the former governor of New South Wales. Lieutenant James Grant was to take command of Supply upon his arrival aboard  on 16 December 1800, however he found Supply had been laid up as a hulk and had been condemned.

Supply was broken up in 1806.

Citations and references
Citations

References

1790s ships
Auxiliary ships of the Royal Navy
1788–1850 ships of Australia
Convict ships to Norfolk Island